Legacy of Leadership is an outdoor 1998 sculpture by Alan Collins, installed on the Andrews University campus in Berrien Springs, Michigan, United States. The bronze sculptural group depicts J. N. Andrews and his children Charles and Mary departing from Boston Harbor in 1874 for missionary work overseas. It was unveiled in front of Pioneer Memorial Church in 1998.

See also

 1998 in art
 Regeneration (1975), another sculpture by Collins at Andrews University

References

1998 establishments in Michigan
1998 sculptures
Andrews University
Bronze sculptures in Michigan
Buildings and structures in Berrien County, Michigan
Outdoor sculptures in Michigan
Sculptures of men in Michigan
Statues in Michigan